Midsocbank (Midsoc), also Midsoc Bank, is a proposed Islamic banking start-up institution in Uganda, the third-largest economy in the East African Community.

Location
The headquarters of Midsocbank are located at 2D Nakasero Hill Road, in the central business district of Kampala, the capital and largest city of Uganda. The geographical coordinates of the bank's headquarters are: 0°19'31.0"N, 32°34'46.0"E (Latitude:0.325278; Longitude:32.579444).

Overview
The founders and organizers of Midsoc Bank plan to establish a Sharia-compliant financial institution with the help of deep-pocketed International Islamic banking institutions, who would offer capital, managerial expertise, training and credibility to the new bank. At a later stage, the institution would diversify in other Islamic financing products, including insurance, re-insurance, sukuk, and other Islamic investments.

Ownership
The proposed ownership of Midsoc Bank is as depicted in the table below:

See also
 List of banks in Uganda

References

External links
  Islamic Banking legalised; what does it mean and will it benefit Uganda?

Banks of Uganda
Islamic banking
Proposed organizations
Companies based in Kampala